Isaiah 56 is the fifty-sixth chapter of the Book of Isaiah in the Hebrew Bible or the Old Testament of the Christian Bible. This book contains the prophecies attributed to the prophet Isaiah, and is one of the Books of the Prophets. Chapter 56 is the first chapter of the final section of the Book of Isaiah, often referred to as Trito-Isaiah.

Text 
The original text was written in Hebrew language. This chapter is divided into 12 verses.

Textual witnesses
Some early manuscripts containing the text of this chapter in Hebrew are of the Masoretic Text tradition, which includes the Codex Cairensis (895), the Petersburg Codex of the Prophets (916), Aleppo Codex (10th century), Codex Leningradensis (1008).

Fragments containing parts of this chapter were found among the Dead Sea Scrolls (3rd century BC or later): 
 1QIsaa: complete
 1QIsab: extant: verses 1‑12
 4QIsah (4Q62): extant: verses 7-8

There is also a translation into Koine Greek known as the Septuagint, made in the last few centuries BCE. Extant ancient manuscripts of the Septuagint version include Codex Vaticanus (B; B; 4th century), Codex Sinaiticus (S; BHK: S; 4th century), Codex Alexandrinus (A; A; 5th century) and Codex Marchalianus (Q; Q; 6th century).

Parashot
The parashah sections listed here are based on the Aleppo Codex. Isaiah 56 is a part of the Consolations (Isaiah 40–66). {P}: open parashah; {S}: closed parashah.
 {P} 56:1-2 {S} 56:3 {P} 56:4-5 {S} 56:6-9 {P} 56:10-12 [57:1-2 {S}]

Verse 5
 Even unto them will I give in mine house
 and within my walls a place and a name 
 better than of sons and of daughters: 
 I will give them an everlasting name,
 that shall not be cut off.
This verse refers to eunuchs who, although they could not have children, could still live for eternity with the Lord.
 Jesus Christ speaks in similar way of this verse in Revelation 3:12
 Him that overcometh will I make a pillar in the temple of my God, and he shall go no more out: and I will write upon him the name of my God, and the name of the city of my God, which is new Jerusalem, which cometh down out of heaven from my God: and I will write upon him my new name.
 The verse was the origin of the name of Yad Vashem (yād wā-šêm, literally, "a memorial and a name"), Israel's national Holocaust memorial.

Verse 7
 Even them will I bring to my holy mountain,
 and make them joyful in my house of prayer:
 their burnt offerings and their sacrifices shall be accepted upon mine altar;
 for mine house shall be called an house of prayer for all people.
Jesus combines the quotes from this verse and Jeremiah 7:11 in Matthew 21:13, (or the parallel verses: Mark 11:17 and Luke 19:46).

See also

 Eunuch
Related Bible parts: Jeremiah 7, Matthew 21, Mark 11, Luke 19, Acts 8, Revelation 3

References

Bibliography

External links

Jewish
Isaiah 56 Original Hebrew with Parallel English

Christian
Isaiah 56 English Translation with Parallel Latin Vulgate

56